Arkansas Highway 35 is a northwest–southeast state highway in southeast Arkansas. The route runs  from Dewey near the Mississippi River northwest to Arkansas Highway 5 in Benton.

Route description

The route begins in Dewey at Macon Lake Road near Island number 81 on the Mississippi River. AR 35 runs through bayous and fields in Chicot County, briefly entering Desha County for a junction with AR 159/AR 208 in Halley.

Returning to Chicot County, AR 35 intersects the four-lane divided US 65/US 278 and US 165 east of Dermott, before entering the city. AR 35 serves Dermott as Speedway St before entering Drew County. The highway runs south of the Seven Devils Swamp WMA along the Arkansas Midland Railroad tracks until Monticello. AR 35 is concurrent with US 278, and later US 425 until the northwest corner of Monticello, where AR 35 turns northwest away from US 425. The highway continues northwest, intersecting AR 530, which is an under-construction segment of the future Monticello Bypass (the bypass itself is a portion of the long-term plan to extend Interstate 69 through Arkansas). A sign exists at where AR 32 will meet I-69 that states "Future I-69 Corridor <--->".

AR 35 continues northwest to enter Cleveland County, where a concurrency with US 63 begins north to Pansy. After Pansy, AR 35 runs northwest through Toledo to Rison, where it passes the American Legion Hut, Texaco Service Station, and Cities Service Station, each on the National Register of Historic Places. East of downtown, AR 35 has a junction with US 79, after which the route serves the rural northwest corner of the county.

The route next enters Grant County, passing through forest/clear cut land to a rural junction with AR 190. West of the AR 190 intersection, AR 35 begins a northbound concurrency with US 167 at Crossroads. This concurrency includes the city of Sheridan including a junction with US 270/AR 46. AR 35 turns west onto West Vine Street, ending the concurrency with US 167. The route runs northwest through rural country, entering Saline. Running past the brine springs for which the county is named, AR 35 enters Benton. In the city, the highway passes near the Gann Row Historic District, the Saline County Courthouse, and the Independent Order of Odd Fellows Building, all NRHP properties. After a large intersection with I-30/US 67/US 70/AR 5, AR 35 continues north to terminate at AR 5 in north Benton.

Major intersections

See also

 List of state highways in Arkansas

References

External links

035
Transportation in Chicot County, Arkansas
Transportation in Desha County, Arkansas
Transportation in Drew County, Arkansas
Transportation in Cleveland County, Arkansas
Transportation in Grant County, Arkansas
Transportation in Saline County, Arkansas